Bihar State Tourism Development Corporation, (abbreviated as BSTDC), is a body of the Government of Bihar responsible for the development of tourism in the Indian state of Bihar. It was established in 1980 to develop tourism in the state. The BSTDC is head-quartered at Patna and has offices across all the districts of Bihar. The agency also operates hotels, resorts, and tourist rest houses in key locations in the state. The corporation provides travellers with information about Bihar to promote travel to and in the country. It operates Tourist Information Centres as well as a website. The BSTDC disseminates information about transportation, lodging, food and beverage, and sight-seeing.

Tourist Information Centres
BSTDC have several tourist reception centres in all major cities and tourist centres, from where conducted tours start and end, in addition to providing complementary information about tourist destinations, maps and guides.

Tourist Information Centres (Inside Bihar) Last Update 10-8-2021

Tourist Information Centre, Patna Junction, Patna

Tourist Information Centre, Jay Prakash Narayan Airport, Patna

Tourist Information Centre, Rajendra Nagar Railway Station, Patna

Tourist Information Centre, Patna Sahib Railway Station, Patna

Tourist Information Centre, Patna Sahib (Gurudwara), Patna

Tourist Information Centre, Railway Station, Gaya

Tourist Information Centre, Tourist Complex, Bodhgaya

Tourist Information Centre, Hotel Gargee Gautam Premises, Rajgir

Tourist Information Centre, Vaishali

Tourist Information Centre, Hotel Lichwi, Railway Station, Muzafferpur

Tourist Information Centre, Combinded Building, Bhagalpur

Tourist Information Centre, Hotel Karn Vihar, Munger

Tourist Information Centres (Outside Bihar) Last Update 10-8-2021

Tourist Information Centre, Flat No 108-110, First Floor, Narayan Manzil, 23 Barhkamba Road, New Delhi-110001

Tourist Information Centre, Nilkanth Bhawan,26B,Camac Street, Kolkata-700016

Tourist Information Centre, Jawaharlal Nehru Market, Englishia Lane, Varanasi-221001

Tourist Information Centre, Ground Floor, MTNL Bhawan, Bandra Kurla Complex, Kurla(west) Mumbai- 400098 [Operated By Bihar Foundation]

See also

Tourism in Bihar
Tourism in Patna
Tourism in India

References

External links
 
Official website of Bihar Tourism

1980 establishments in Bihar
Government agencies established in 1980
Tourism in Bihar
State agencies of Bihar
State tourism development corporations of India
Companies based in Patna